The Nottinghamshire Police and Crime Commissioner is the police and crime commissioner, an elected official tasked with setting out the way crime is tackled by Nottinghamshire Police in the English County of Nottinghamshire.

The incumbent is Caroline Henry, representing the Conservative Party, who was returned in May 2021 with 138,658 votes. Paddy Tipping representing the Labour Party was returned in second place, polling 131,302 votes.

Following the election of Henry, within days changes were instigated to scrap the role of Deputy Commissioner, citing a potential saving of up to £78,000. In late 2021, Henry announced the appointment of Sharon Caddell as "interim CEO".

As of January 2022, recruitment was underway for a Chief Executive Officer with a salary of £86,630.

History
The post was created in November 2012, following an election held on 15 November 2012, and replaced the Nottinghamshire Police Authority. The inaugural incumbent Paddy Tipping was returned in 2012 and again in 2016.

Elections for the third term  were scheduled for 6 May 2021, having been postponed from May 2020 due to COVID-19 restrictions, with the Conservative Party fielding a candidate for the first time in Caroline Henry, wife of Conservative MP Darren Henry.

The final candidate was confirmed as David Watt, a solicitor and a Nottinghamshire local Liberal Democrat ward councillor at Broxtowe Borough Council, with the Lib Dems also fielding a candidate for the first time.

List of Nottinghamshire Police and Crime Commissioners

References

Police and crime commissioners in England